Guernsey is the second largest of the Channel Islands. It is part of the Common Travel Area, allowing passport-free travel to and from the United Kingdom or Jersey. Travel to and from mainland Europe requires a passport or an EU national identity document. Non EU citizens may need a visa.

This article includes some references to Alderney and Sark, which are part of the Bailiwick of Guernsey.

Road transport

Traffic in Guernsey drives on the left. Motor tax was abolished in Guernsey from 1 January 2008. There are seven taxi ranks in St Peter Port. Vehicle registration plates in Guernsey carry between one and five numerals only; the international identification sticker/plate is "GBG". 

Most road markings are the same as the UK, with the exception of:
 A yellow line across the exit of a minor road means stop and give way to traffic on the major road. A yellow arrow painted on the road gives warning of a yellow stop line ahead.
 Junctions marked filter-in-turn. At these junctions all directions have equal priority.
 Yellow kerb side no stopping lines are single lines and mean you must not stop for any reason, other than to avoid an accident.

Buses

Bus services are operated by CT Plus Guernsey on behalf of the Environment Department of the States of Guernsey (the island's government).  They are currently branded as Buses.gg. Vehicles used are based on buses used in the UK but with a slightly narrower construction, to allow them to circulate on the island's narrow roads, legal limit 2.31 meters (7' 6¾"). A number of narrower (and shorter) StreetVibe buses arrived from May 2017.

Most bus fares have a fixed price of £1.25 per journey, however fares alternate depending on service types. Payments can only be made by contactless or by 'Puffin Pass', these passes come in different varieties covering Pay As You Go which is reduced to 75p, unlimited travel for a day or more, student passes for ages 5-16, concession cards for ages 65+ and family travel passes which are also available. 1.65m journeys were taken in 2016.

Private hire coaches and coach tours are available from Intransit, Island Coachways, and Island Taxis.

Cycling
Cycling is encouraged in Guernsey. Although there are currently few cycle lanes on main roads, the Ruettes Tranquilles provide safer and more pleasant cycle-friendly roads.
The States of Guernsey provides details of cycling laws and recommendations for safety as well as details of cycle hire businesses.
Sark is a popular cycle-friendly island.

Taxis
Guernsey has a regulated, licensed taxi service based at three ranks in central St Peter Port, St Sampson's (at 'The Bridge') and at Guernsey Airport. Taxis can also be called or phoned.

Accessible taxis capable of transporting a wheelchair passenger and with improved lighting to assist people who may have a visual impairment are available.

Visit Guernsey website has a list of taxi operators.

Petit Train
A "Petit Train" called "Victor" transports people around St Peter Port throughout the summer months.

Carbon output
With effect from 2030 the sale of new combustion engine cars will be banned, this forms part of the net-zero climate change plan.

Air transport 
Airlines operating scheduled services to and from Guernsey include Aurigny (owned by the States of Guernsey) and Blue Islands year round. British Airways operates seasonal and charter summer services to the UK and Europe, operated by its subsidiary BA CityFlyer. 

Alderney Airport has regular scheduled flights to Southampton and Guernsey operated by Aurigny.

Both airports have private aircraft facilities and annual air rallies.

Maritime transport 

Condor Ferries operate services to Poole and Portsmouth in England, Cherbourg and St Malo in France, and to Jersey. Condor Ferries became the main operator to the UK following the closure of British Channel Island Ferries in 1994. Previously Sealink (and its railway ferries predecessors) had been the main operator for many decades. Freight goes on a traditional ferry via Portsmouth.

The French company Manche Îles Express operates a summer passenger-only ferry service between Guernsey and three small ports in Normandy, France: Barneville-Carteret, Diélette and Granville. Not every port is served daily.

The Isle of Sark Shipping Company operates small ferries to Sark. The service takes up to 45 minutes for the  crossing.

Travel Trident operates small ferries to Herm during the summer months. The island also operates its own ferry service between Guernsey and Herm all year round

The Alderney Ferry Service operates a small ferry between Guernsey and 
Alderney during summer months.

Alderney Shipping operates freight routes between Poole, Jersey, Guernsey and Alderney.

Railways

Alderney

The Alderney Railway provides a rail link of approximately two miles, with a regular timetabled service during the summer months and at seasonal festivals including Easter and Christmas. It is now the only working railway on the Channel Islands to provide a public transport link. It is also one of the oldest railways in the British Isles, dating from 1847, and carried Queen Victoria and Prince Albert as the first 'official' passengers in 1857.

There is also a  gauge miniature railway on Alderney, which operates during the summer months.

Guernsey

There are currently no railway services on Guernsey. The Guernsey Railway, which was virtually an electric tramway, and which began working on 20 February 1892, was abandoned on 9 June 1934. It replaced an earlier transport system which was worked by steam, and was named the Guernsey Steam Tramway. The latter began service on 6 June 1879 with six locomotives.

See also

 Bailiwick of Guernsey
 List of shipwrecks in the Channel Islands
 Speed limits in Guernsey

References

External links

 
.Guernsey
Guernsey